Lana Bastašić (born 27 August 1986) is a Bosnian and Serbian writer, novelist and translator. She was born in Zagreb, Yugoslavia.

Biography 
She was born in Zagreb to a Serbian family in 1986 and immigrated to Banja Luka, Bosnia-Herzegovina as a young child. She studied English at the University of Banja Luka and received an MA in Cultural Studies from the University of Belgrade. In addition to novels, Bastašić has written in many different genres: short stories, children’s stories, poetry, and stage plays. Her debut novel Catch the Rabbit was published in Belgrade in 2018, and then reprinted in Sarajevo. The structure of the book draws inspiration from Alice's Adventures in Wonderland with themes of exile, identity, and is divided into twelve chapters, as is Alice's Adventures in Wonderland. It won the 2020 EU Prize for Literature and was shortlisted for the NIN Award. It was translated into English by Bastašić herself and published by Picador in the UK and Restless Books in the US. In 2017, Bastašić has signed the Declaration on the Common Language of the Croats, Serbs, Bosniaks and Montenegrins.

She currently resides in Switzerland.

Bibliography

Short story collections 

 Permanent Pigments (Trajni pigmenti), 2010. 
 Fireworks (Vatrometi), 2013
 Milk Teeth (Mliječni zubi), 2020.

Novels 

 Catch the Rabbit (Uhvati zeca), 2021.

References

Bosnia and Herzegovina women writers
1986 births
Living people
Writers from Zagreb
Serbs of Croatia
Signatories of the Declaration on the Common Language